José Luis Valiente Giménez (born 18 May 1991) is a Spanish professional footballer who plays as a midfielder for Greek Super League club Asteras Tripolis.

Career 
Born in Alzira, Valencia, Valiente finished his formation with Alicante CF, making his senior debut with the reserves in the 2010–11 season, in Tercera División. He went on to represent UD Alzira in the same tier before joining Segunda División B club CD Olímpic de Xàtiva on 26 July 2014.

On 8 July 2015, Valiente agreed to a contract with Levante UD and was assigned to the B-team also in the third division. On 19 July 2016, he moved to fellow league team Lleida Esportiu, and made his debut for the latter on 21 August by playing the full 90 minutes of a 0–1 defeat against CF Badalona.

On 1 June 2018, after two full seasons as a starter with Lleida, Valiente terminated his contract. He moved abroad three days later, joining Greek club Asteras Tripolis FC after agreeing to a three-year deal. He made his professional debut on 2 August, starting in a 1–1 draw against Scottish club Hibernian FC in the UEFA Europa League.

Valiente scored his first professional goal on 25 September 2018, in a 2–1 home win against Apollon Smyrnis FC for the season's Greek Cup. His first league goal came on 22 October, in a 2–3 loss at Atromitos FC.

Career statistics

References

External links

1991 births
Living people
Spanish footballers
Association football midfielders
Segunda División B players
Tercera División players
CD Olímpic de Xàtiva footballers
Atlético Levante UD players
Lleida Esportiu footballers
Super League Greece players
Asteras Tripolis F.C. players
Spanish expatriate footballers
Spanish expatriate sportspeople in Greece
Expatriate footballers in Greece